There are two different kana (Japanese script) representations for the romanization ve:
 ヴォ: U (ウ) with dakuten (voicing marks), followed by a small O (オ)
 less commonly ヺ: Wo (ヲ) with dakuten